Baccaurea polyneura is a species of plant in the family Phyllanthaceae. It is native to Peninsular Malaysia, and Sumatra island of Indonesia. The fruit, called jentik, is edible, if sour, and is locally harvested and sold.

Description 
It has a dense crown growing up to 5-30 meters tall. The plant's bole can be 10-90 cm in diameter and has small buttresses. Baccaurea polyneura grows to a mid-canopy of primary, secondary and swamp rain forests at elevations from 20 to 600 meters. As such, they are mainly found on hillsides and ridges, and sometimes on alluvial sites.

When unripe, the fruit takes an evergreen color with its dioecious tree growing up to 11-32 meters in height. When ripe and fresh, the fruit takes a more bark brown to white brown to red brown. As it dries, it appears brown.

Uses 
The edible fruit is collected from the wild and can sometimes be found in local markets.

Cultivation 
Baccaurea polyneura grows in the wild on sand, clay, loam and granite soils. It flowers and fruit all year old. As a dioecious plant, it requires both a male and female counterpart to be grown to cultivate fruit and seed.

References

polyneura
Flora of Peninsular Malaysia
Flora of Sumatra
Conservation dependent plants
Near threatened flora of Asia
Taxonomy articles created by Polbot
Taxa named by Joseph Dalton Hooker